Ingeborg Synnøve Midttømme (born 1961) is a Norwegian Lutheran bishop for the Diocese of Møre in the Church of Norway. Midttømme was born in Oslo, Norway on 20 November 1961.  She has been the Bishop since 2008.  She was elected as the first female leader of the Norwegian Association of Clergy trade union in 2003.

Midttømme attended the MF Norwegian School of Theology and graduated in 1986.  She was ordained as a priest in 1987.  She worked in Høybråten in Oslo from 1987 until 1993.  She then became the parish priest for Sørfold in the Salten region in Northern Norway from 1993 until 1997.  In 1997 she took a chaplain job in Holmlia in Oslo.  She was appointed Bishop of the Diocese of Møre in 2008.

References

1961 births
Living people
Norwegian trade unionists
Bishops of Møre
21st-century Lutheran bishops
Women Lutheran bishops